The 2017 6 Hours of Shanghai was an endurance sports car racing event held at the Shanghai International Circuit, Shanghai, China on 3—5 November 2017, and served as the eighth race of the 2017 FIA World Endurance Championship. Toyota's Anthony Davidson, Sébastien Buemi and Kazuki Nakajima won the race driving the No. 8 Toyota TS050 Hybrid.

Qualifying

Qualifying result

Race

Race result

Class winners are denoted with a yellow background.

References

External links 
 

6 Hours of Shanghai
Shanghai
Shanghai
6 Hours of Shanghai